Advancement and recognition in the Scout Association of Hong Kong is a tradition dating from the inception of the Scouting movement. A fundamental purpose of advancement is the self-confidence a young man or woman acquires from his participation in Scouting. Advancement is one of the methods used in the "Aims of Scouting"– character development, citizenship training and personal fitness.

There are separate advancement and recognition programs for the three main program divisions: Cub Scouting, Boy Scouting, and Venturing. Each program is designed for its age group and goals.

The Scout Progressive Badge scheme is a scheme which assess Scouts. This scheme can reflect the overall ability of Scouting skills.

Membership badge
This is a badge which is required for all Scouts 11 or above who understand and accept the Scout Law, Scout Promise and the Scout Motto.

Pathfinder Award
Pathfinder Badge is the second stage of the Scout 11 or above, and requires knowledge of Scoutcraft, first aid, safety, use of knots and hitches and so on.

Voyager Award
This is the badge most Scouts will get, the third stage of the progressive badge scheme. It is more camping, woodcraft and orienteering intensive.

Challenger Award
The Challenger award is the fourth stage and the second to last stage of the scheme. It involves more cooking, boating, electronics, and community activities.

Chief Scout's Award
This is the highest stage. Every year several hundred Scouts aged 14 or above attain this award (ratio 1:180-190). They can participate in the Scout Rally regardless of their troop. A unique feature at this level is an overnight hike from dusk to dawn, as well as participation in an international Scout exchange programme.

Proficiency badges 

Proficiency badges are called "greenbacks", the most primary kind of badges, usually earned between age 11-13. They include Angler, Animal Care, Archer, Artist, Athlete, Camp Cook, Canoeist, Collector, Cyclist, Dragon Boatman, Footdrill, Geologist, Horseman, Librarian, Model Making, Musician, Naturalist, Park Orienteer, Photographer, Rowing Boatman, Sailor, Smallholder (for animal keeping and plant cultivating), Swimmer, Tourism, and Windsurfer badges.

References

Scout and Guide awards
Scouting and Guiding in Hong Kong